Tragodesmoceras is a large moderately involute ammonite with deeply embracing whorls that are higher than wide, a steep sided umbilicus and a narrowly rounded venter. Ornament consists of primary ribs that begin at the umbilical shoulder and smaller secondary ribs that begin mid flank. Ribs are sigmodal, periodically thickened and bent forward on the outer flank to cross the venter as chevrons. The suture has a broad trifid lateral lobe.

Species include Tregodesmoceras clypealoides (type), known from western Europe and the U.S., Tragodesmosderas bassi, known from Arizona and Kansas, and Tragodesoceras socorroense  known from Arizona and New Mexico.

The related Muniericeras is more evolute in form, but otherwise similar.

References
 W.J. Arkell, et al., 1957.  Mesozoic Ammonoidea, Treatise on Invertebrate Paleontology Part L Mollusca 4.  Geological Society of America and University of Kansas Press.
 William A Cobban & Stephen C. Hook. 1983. . Mid-Cretaceous (Turonian) ammonite fauna from Fence Lake area of west-central New Mexico. Memoir 41 New Mexico Bureau of Mines and Mineral Resources.

Desmoceratoidea
Cretaceous ammonites
Ammonites of North America
Ammonitida genera